Nedzheli ( or Ниджили; , Nicili) is a lake in Kobyaysky District, Sakha Republic (Yakutia), Russia. 

The lake is a protected area of regional significance.

Geography
Nedzheli is located near the Lena, about  —in a straight line— southwest of the village of Sangar. It is the largest lake in the Central Yakut Plain (Leno-Vilyui interfluve) and the 9th largest in Yakutia. The lake is elongated in an east to west direction. It is fed mainly by snow and freezes between late September / early October and mid June.

Flora and fauna
The vegetation of the area surrounding the Nedzheli is mainly larch and pine taiga.

The lake is rich in fish. The crucian carp variety of the Nedzheli is highly appreciated in Yakutia and has been introduced to other lakes in the region. Siberian cranes, black-headed gulls, river terns, Eurasian teals, ruffs and diving ducks are common in the shores of the lake. In former times the Nedzheli used to be a breeding place of the common goldeneye, but since the local people began to use motor boats the population declined dramatically.

See also
List of lakes of Russia

References 

Lakes of the Sakha Republic
Central Yakutian Lowland